Kwizera Arnold (born 24 September 1993) is a Rwandan journalist, radio and television personality. Arnold is an anchor for CNBC Africa, a pan African business news channel. He is a former co-host of Kigali In The Morning, a radio breakfast show on Royal Fm. Arnold is a former sports anchor of Rise and shine Rwanda, a morning news show on the national broadcaster Rwanda Television.

He is also a former writer with Kigali Today, a local newspaper, and a former sports editor at the Rwanda Focus newspaper. Arnold began hosting sports on Rise and Shine Rwanda on 15 October 2014, making it the first breakfast show on television in Rwanda.

Arnold grew up in Uganda where he attended the prestigious St. Mary's College Kisubi for his ordinary level  before joining St. Lawrence Paris Palais for his high school. At high school Arnold was an active sportsman, captaining the St. Lawrence high school team known as the Mad Rhinos to their first ever title in a season where he was voted most promising player. He was also part of the Uganda fifteens U-19 rugby team.

Following his mother's death in 2012, Arnold moved back to Rwanda where he worked as a co-host for one of the most popular radio shows, Ten Sports on Radio Ten, making him the first English speaking sports show host in the country. In 2013 he was snapped by rival station Radio Flash FM to co-host a weekly two-hour sports show.

Early life
Arnold was born in Westville, South Africa in 1993 before moving to Uganda when he was two to join his mother. His father was a DJ. As a boy, Arnold used to DJ at friends' birthday parties.

Love for sports

He developed his love for sports at a young age. At the age of 9 Arnold won his first national championship as he was crowned the Baroda U-10 badminton champion. He was also the captain of the school cricket team and a member of the football team.

After joining St. Mary's college Kisubi for his high school Arnold developed a great love for rugby, quickly excelling at the sport as he became the youngest member of its prestigious rugby team known as the Smack Eagles playing as a scrumhalf. He later moved to rival school St. Lawrence High school and led them to their first rugby title in front of a packed Smack crowd.

Semi-professional rugby career

After his high school Arnold joined a local rugby club known as Pirates where he played in the national league before a career ending knee injury cut his career short.

He moved back to Durban to pursue his degree in economics at the University of Kwazulu Natal, but the death of his mother in 2012 forced him to move back to Rwanda.

Radio career

Arnold currently co-hosts Kigali's most popular English breakfast show dubbed Kigali In The Morning on Royal Fm with Jackie Lumbasi. He got his radio breakthrough on the popular sports radio show Ten Sports on Radio Ten as the only English speaking co-host. The move made him the first English speaking sports show host in the country. A few months later he made his move to rival station Flash FM, hosting his own weekly two hour sports show. In October 2015, he joined Royal Fm, a Kigali-based radio station, where he presents the Royal Sports show every Saturday morning.

Television career

On 1 October 2014 it was announced that the national broadcaster RTV was introducing a daily news breakfast show, of which Kwizera Arnold was set to be the sports news anchor. The show made its debut on 15 October 2014.

Arnold also appears as a guest on a number of radio and TV shows in Rwanda.

References

http://www.rwandan-flyer.com/tourism-still-country-s-leading-foreign-exchange-earner
http://www.ipsos.co.ke/NEWBASE_EXPORTS/BRALIRWA%20RWANDA/131204_The%20Rwanda%20Focus_25_666c2.xml
https://web.archive.org/web/20150924040027/http://www.ipsos.co.ke/NEWBASE_EXPORTS/Private%20Sector%20Federation/131204_The%20Rwanda%20Focus_26_666c0.xml
https://www.newtimes.co.rw/section/read/229842
Jackie Lumbasi, Arnold Kwizera Launch Kigali In The Morning, Rwanda’s First English Breakfast Show on ROYAL FM, 2/11/2018.

1993 births
Living people
People from eThekwini Metropolitan Municipality
Rwandan journalists
Sports journalists